Bumetopia oscitans is a species of beetle in the family Cerambycidae. It was described by Francis Polkinghorne Pascoe in 1858.

Subspecies
 Bumetopia oscitans oscitans Pascoe, 1858
 Bumetopia oscitans senkakuana Hayashi, 1972

References

Homonoeini
Beetles described in 1858